On 6 January 2016, Wayan Mirna Salihin died in the hospital after drinking a Vietnamese iced coffee at the Olivier Cafe in the Grand Indonesia shopping mall in Jakarta. According to the police, cyanide poisoning was most likely the cause of Mirna's death. Police have charged Jessica Kumala Wongso with her murder. The case became the most famous and phenomenal murder case in 2016 in Indonesia, with the Indonesian media covering the case extensively. The ruling of the case was televised on national television and watched by millions of Indonesians.

Background 

Born in 1988, Mirna Salihin was the daughter of businessman Edi Darmawan Salihin. She had just recently married Arief Soemarko weeks before her death.

Murder investigation 

At 3:32 p.m. on 6 January 2016, 27-year-old Jessica Kumala Wongso arrived at Grand Indonesia shopping mall in Jakarta to meet her friends at 5 p.m., including Salihin. After making a reservation at the Olivier Cafe and doing some shopping, Wongso returned to the cafe at 4:14 p.m. and ordered drinks, including the Vietnamese iced coffee that allegedly killed Salihin. Wongso waited until Salihin arrived at 5:16 p.m. and during this time the drinks were hidden from the view of the security camera with shopping bags Wongso had placed on the table. Soon after arriving, Salihin took a sip of the coffee and complained that the coffee tasted horrible before losing consciousness shortly after. An ambulance was called to the cafe and Salihin was rushed to Abdi Waluyo Hospital in Menteng, Central Jakarta, where she later died at 6 p.m.

According to the autopsy conducted at Kramat Jati Police Hospital on 10 January, evidence of bleeding was found in Salihin's stomach. The police claimed that cyanide was found both in the coffee Salihin drank as well as in her stomach.

On 30 January 2016, Wongso, a former permanent resident of Australia, was charged with the premeditated murder of Wayan Mirna Salihin and was taken into police custody pending trial. The Australian Federal Police handed over confidential files regarding Wongso's psychological state, amongst them a restraining order against her made by an ex-boyfriend, to Indonesian authorities. Wongso’s lawyer Yudi Wibowo denied her client's involvement in Salihin's death.

Trial, verdict, and appeal 

The trial began 15 June, approximately a month after Jessica Kumala Wongso was named a suspect. The nearly 5 month (135-day) trial was broadcast live and became a national spectacle. On 27 October 2016, Jessica Kumala Wongso was found guilty of the murder of Wayan Mirna Salihin by putting cyanide poison into Mirna’s coffee. She was sentenced to 20 years.

The Jakarta Post said that "In line with the indictment, the judges concluded that Jessica murdered Mirna in revenge for repeatedly telling Jessica to break up with Patrick O'Connor, her former Australian boyfriend."

After a lengthy appeal first being rejected at The Jakarta High court and then again in the Supreme Court presided over by Judges Artidjo Alkostar, Salman Luthan and Sumardiyatmo who unanimously turned down Jessica’s cassation appeal. "[We] reject the cassation," said the Supreme Court spokesman Suhadi as quoted by tribunnews.com on Wednesday.

References 

2016 murders in Indonesia
2010s in Jakarta
January 2016 crimes in Asia
Deaths by person in Asia
Filmed killings
Murder in Jakarta
Indonesian people of Chinese descent